Sphinx International Airport  is a public airport, serving the city of Giza, on the western side of Cairo, Egypt.

History
In October 2017, it was announced that the airport will be open to commercial flights in summer 2018 and is set to start experimental operations in October 2018.

In January 2019 EgyptAir Express launched test flights to Hurghada, Sharm El Sheikh, Luxor and Aswan.

On 1 January 2020, the airport received its first international flight from Jordan, operated by Fly Jordan. On 2 November 2022, scheduled flights from Sharm El Sheikh to Sphinx airport started. The airport is operational but still undergoing final fit.

Facilities
The airport is adjacent to and shares some infrastructure with the Cairo West Air Base. It is located on the Cairo-Alexandria desert road. The aircraft parking ramp and terminal facilities are on the west side of the runway. The Cairo West TACAN (Ident: BLA) is located on the field.

This is to accommodate an increase in passenger traffic expected as a result of the opening of the Grand Egyptian Museum. This is in addition to a banking and quarantine area, a baggage claim area, eight passport counters, eight escalators, and a cooling plant with a capacity of 1,440 tons of refrigeration.

Airlines and destinations
The following airlines operate regular scheduled and charter flights at Giza Sphinx Airport:

See also
 List of airports in Egypt
 Transport in Egypt
 Cairo International Airport
 Capital International Airport
 New Administrative Capital of Egypt

References

External links
 Great Circle Mapper – Cairo West AB
 OpenStreetMap – Sphinx Int'l
 

Airports in Egypt
Transport in Egypt